Holli Woodings is an American politician who served in Idaho House of Representatives, representing District 19B, which covers the northern section of Boise, Idaho. She was the 2014 Democratic nominee for Idaho secretary of state. Woodings now serves on the Boise City Council.

Education
Woodings was born in Medford, Oregon. She earned a Bachelor of Arts degree in English from Boise State University.

Elections
When Representative Brian Cronin retired and left the 19B seat open, Woodings won the three-way May 15, 2012 Democratic Primary with 1,636 votes (56.4%), and won the November 6, 2012 General election with 14,378 votes (65.7%) against Republican nominee Don Howard.

Woodings ran unsuccessfully to succeed Republican Ben Ysursa for Secretary of State of Idaho.

At the Idaho State Democratic Convention Woodings was chosen to be a delegate for Hillary Clinton at the 2016 Democratic National Convention.

Woodings has served on the Boise City Council since January 2018. She also serves as city council president pro tem.

References

External links
Holli Woodings at the Idaho Legislature
Campaign site
 

Year of birth missing (living people)
Living people
Boise State University alumni
Democratic Party members of the Idaho House of Representatives
People from Boise, Idaho
Politicians from Eugene, Oregon
Women state legislators in Idaho
21st-century American politicians
21st-century American women politicians
Idaho city council members
Women city councillors in Idaho